Dr. Mohammed Ragab Ahmad, an Egyptian politician, is head of the Representative Group of the ruling National Democratic Party in the Shoura Council of Egypt. He is also a member of the African Union's Pan-African Parliament.

External links
Members of the Pan-African Parliament

Members of the Pan-African Parliament from Egypt
Year of birth missing (living people)
Living people
Members of the Shura Council
National Democratic Party (Egypt) politicians
Place of birth missing (living people)